Criminal Justice is an Indian Hindi-language crime thriller legal drama web series for Hotstar Specials, based on the 2008 British television series of the same name, written by Shridhar Raghavan and was directed by Tigmanshu Dhulia and Vishal Furia. Starring Pankaj Tripathi, Vikrant Massey, Jackie Shroff, Anupriya Goenka and Mita Vashisht in lead roles, the storyline follows the life of individuals on a gut-wrenching journey through the criminal justice system.

Criminal Justice was released through Hotstar on 5 April 2019. It received positive response from critics, praising the performances of the principal characters, Tripathi, Massey and Shroff respectively.

In February 2020, the makers announced for the second season, titled Criminal Justice: Behind Closed Doors, which was released through Disney+ Hotstar on 24 December 2020. Criminal Justice: Adhura Sach, the third season of the series, premiered on Disney+ Hotstar on 26 August 2022. It follows the murder case of a young celebrity.

Plot
Criminal Justice is a thriller series, starring Pankaj Tripathi, Vikrant Massey, Jackie Shroff, Anupriya Goenka, Mita Vashisht, Rucha Inamdar, Jagat Rawath, Rithuraj Singh, Tuhina Vora. The series focuses on how Aditya Sharma's (portrayed by Vikrant Massey) life changes after being falsely accused of murdering Sanaya Rath (portrayed by Madhurima Roy). The series is split into 10 episodes.

The series starts by introducing Aditya Sharma as a cab driver who comes from a middle-class family. He will have plans of meeting his friends at a pub after completing his work, but a foul-mouthed lady sits in his cab and keeps on changing location, because of which all his night plans become jeopardized, while talking to her they realize that they are alumni of the same college. The lady suffers from mood swings, so it can be easily come to know that she is a drug addict. The lady's name was later revealed to be Sanaya Rath.

Aditya gets caught in the police station itself when the neighbour who will be giving his statement happens to identify him as the murderer, the police inspector 'Raghu Salian’ (Pankaj Saraswat) and the others search him and they find the murder weapon (they at least assume it to be) with him. While interrogating, Madhav Mishra (Pankaj Tripathi) a street-smart advocate happens to mistake Aditya's case to be a drunk and driving case and tells Raghu Salian that he is Aditya's lawyer, he then realises that he will be handling a murder case and that's how his life changes. Madhav Mishra informs Aditya's parents about the crime and that Aditya has been accused of murdering and raping Sanaya Rath. Aditya is produced before the magistrate within 24 hours and he pleads not guilty, however, his request for bail is rejected by the Magistrate. Because of which he will be placed in Police custody for 14 days. Aditya agrees to do a narco test, and a selected portion of it is shown online. People start shaming the taxi services company where Aditya will be working. Aditya's brother-in-law (Gaurav Dwiwedi) soon starts getting harassed by recovery agents due to non-payment of loan. Aditya's sister (Rucha Inamdar) loses her job and the entire family becomes a victim of ridicule by the society. Raghu Salian is hell bent on proving that Aditya is the murderer. Mandira Mathur (Mita Vashisht), a Supreme Court advocate soon starts looking after Aditya's case, she starts representing Aditya and becomes the defence lawyer and Advocate Bhandarkar (Ninad Kamat) becomes the public prosecutor. She has a knack with her usage of words, she helps drop Aditya's charge on rape by proving that it was consensual, but however fails to get him an acquittal. Aditya is asked to sign a plea bargaining agreement (where if you plead guilty your sentence will be reduced), as all the evidences point towards him. Mandira Mathur drops the case and Nikhat (Anupriya Goenka), her assistant starts representing Aditya as she asks Aditya to listen to what his heart says, because of which Aditya pleads not guilty.

The series soon drifts into life spent by a convict in prison, this is where we can draw similarity between Criminal Justice Season 1 and Shawshank redemption, where you see Aditya slowly adapting to the prison environment, just like Andrew "Andy" Dufresne (Tim Robbins). He joins Mustafa (Jackie Shroff) and gang, after being rescued by Taklya (Tushar Gaware) when Layak Talukdar (Dibyendu Bhattacharya) tries to seduce him. The prison is entirely split into two groups, Layak's gang and Mustafa's gang. Aditya starts jelling with Mustafa and gang and in one of the episodes, Aditya is sent to Solitary confinement for 1 year along with Mustafa for being wrongfully caught for peddling drugs in the prison. And then the series focuses on how Aditya starts rebelling against Layak becoming like one of the member of Mustafa's gang. Meanwhile, Aditya's sister divorces her husband and battles for child custody, Aditya's father starts earning again to survive. But they are still left with hope that Aditya will get released from the prison one day.

Coming back to the case, Nikhat and Madhav start investigating the case together and they build a good rapport with each other. Nikhat, Madhav and Raghu Salian soon find out that Sanaya Rath is a drug addict, and she was a volunteer in LDFR, a drug rehabilitation centre, run by Naresh Lakani and his wife Kanika Lakani, a girl named Pallavi (ex-employee of LDFR) reveals that Naresh Lakani runs a racket of child prostitution by trading under privileged children. Sanaya wanted to reveal this secret to public and Kanika Lakani wanted to stop this from happening. In the end, Aditya fights with Layak and when he is about to kill him, Mustafa does it for him. Aditya is released from the prison. He comes out braver and better than what he was before going into prison.

 Pankaj Tripathi as Madhav Mishra
 Jackie Shroff as Mustafa
 Anupriya Goenka as Nikhat Hussain
 Mita Vashisht  as Mandira Mathur
 Rucha Inamdar as Avni Parashar
 Gaurang Dwivedi as Gautam Parashar
 Annapurna Vitthal Bhairi as Sujata Sharma
 Ninad Kamat as Sunil Bhandarkar
 Rituraj Singh as Dr. Naresh Lakhani
 Tuhinaa Vohra as Kanika Lakhani
 Madhurima Roy as Sanaya Rath
 Sanjay Gurbaxani as Rustom Barucha
 Gayatri Gauri as Ronjana
 Pankaj Saraswat as ACP Raghu Salian
 Dibyendu Bhattacharya as Layak Talukder
 Raaj Gopal Iyer as Constable Namdeo Jadhav
 Komal Chhabriya as Rukhsana Hussain
 Dhiraj Totlani as Jimmy D’souza
 Rukhsana Behruzi as Justice Smita Thakur

Episodes

Production 
In January 2018, Sameer Nair, CEO of Aditya Birla Group's content studio Applause Entertainment, collaborated with BBC Studios, in order to adapt their British series Criminal Justice and The Office, for the Indian audiences. Sameer teamed up with Shridhar Raghavan, to pen the screenplay and dialogues for the Hindi adaptation. In April 2018, Tigmanshu Dhulia was announced as the director of the series, eventually marking his digital debut, and the makers signed Pankaj Tripathi, Vikrant Massey and Jackie Shroff to play the pivotal characters. It also marked Shroff's debut in a digital platform. Principal shoot of the series began on 28 April 2018 and was completed in January 2019, with filming mostly held in Mumbai. Vishal Furia served the credits for co-direction.

Release 
The series' digital distribution rights were brought by Hotstar. On 15 January 2019, the platform announced its foray to original content production exclusively for the service, with the shows release on its label called Hotstar Specials, was officially announced. The platform eventually collaborated with Applause Entertainment for releasing the show, along with the production house's four other shows in the first set of their original contents. The official trailer of the series was released on 28 March 2019. It was released on 5 April 2019, in Hindi and dubbed Tamil, Telugu, Malayalam, Kannada, Bengali and Marathi languages.

Reception

Critical response 
Archika Khurana of The Times of India gave three-and-a-half out of five stars stating "Criminal Justice walks us through a series of events that happen during remand, judicial custody, and hearings, is intriguing and engrossing for most parts." Sanjukta Sharma of Scroll.in opined "Criminal Justice works because of the story and its two central characters." Sana Farzeen writing for The Indian Express says, "Vikrant Massey stands out playing a young boy who suddenly finds himself in a grave situation. Pankaj Tripathi once again aces a character with dry humor, making you smirk at his witty lines." The critic recommends Criminal Justice for those who like crime-based dramas.

Rohan Naahar of Hindustan Times rates it with three-and-a-half out of five stars and feels that the series being a remake relies on its actors to do the heavy lifting. He opines, "Fortunately, Vikrant Massey, Pankaj Tripathi and especially Jackie Shroff, are tremendous." Udita Jhunjhunwala, reviewing for The Quint writes "Supporting cast members Saraswat, Rucha Inamdar and Gaurav Dwivedi (as Aditya’s sister and brother-in-law respectively) and Madhurima Roy as the murdered girl are the most convincing." Parmita Uniyal of India Today said that "[Jackie]'s performance is one of the high points of the series, something that stays with you," while also saying that "[The show] could have a stronger impact with shorter episodes, crisper editing and right twists and turns."

Accolades

Sequels
 
On 13 February 2020, Sameer Nair announced a second installment of Criminal Justice, with Pankaj Saraswat, Raaj Gopal Iyer, Pankaj Tripathi, Anupriya Goenka, Mita Vashisht reprising their roles from their first season, whereas Jisshu Sengupta and Kirti Kulhari joined the new cast. The series was released through Disney+ Hotstar on 24 December 2020.

 

The third installment was released on 26th August 2022 with Pankaj Tripathi and Shweta Basu Prasad in the lead roles.  Pankaj Tripathi and Khushboo Atre would be reprising their roles from previous 2 seasons, whereas Purab Kohli, Swastika Mukherjee, Adinath Kothare, Kalyanee Mulay, Aaditya Gupta, Deshna Dugad and Aatm Prakash Mishra are new addition to the cast.

References

External links
  
 

Hindi-language Disney+ Hotstar original programming
2019 Indian television series debuts
 Indian drama television series
 Indian legal television series
 Hindi-language television shows
 Indian television series based on British television series
 Television shows set in Mumbai